Whistleblower Protection Act of 1778 was penned as a resolution title by the Second Continental Congress during the British occupation of the Province of Pennsylvania often referred as the Philadelphia campaign. The public law established a resolve for American colonists confronting;

The Act of Congress was enacted as a public law by the fifth President of the Continental Congress Henry Laurens in York, Pennsylvania on July 30, 1778.

Origins of 1778 Whistleblower Act
The Whistleblower Protection Act of 1778 culminated as a result of stated altercations by a Continental Navy Commodore defying British prisoners of war confined or imprisoned on the frigate  adrift in the Providence River.

In February 1777, ten Continental Navy mariners filed petitions with the Eastern Navy Board, Marine Committee, and ultimately the Continental Congress alleging misconduct violations by USS Warren Commodore Esek Hopkins.

The Complaint Petitions as Filed by the Continental Navy Mariners

See also
Military Whistleblower Protection Act
Whistleblower Protection Act
Whistleblower protection in the United States

References

Reading bibliography

External links
  
 
 

1770s in the Thirteen Colonies
1778 in American law
1778 in Pennsylvania
1778 in the United States
Continental Congress